La Haute-Saint-Charles is a borough of Quebec City. Population (2006): 74,070. It comprises Lac-Saint-Charles, Saint-Émile, Neufchâtel, Loretteville and Val-Bélair.

It also entirely surrounds the urban Indian reserve of Wendake, which is autonomous from the borough.

See also
Municipal reorganization in Quebec
Lac-Saint-Charles–Saint-Émile

References

Boroughs of Quebec City
Canada geography articles needing translation from French Wikipedia